Thurnby and Bushby, sometimes known as Thurnby, is a civil parish in the Harborough district of Leicestershire, England.

According to the 2001 census it had a population of 3,147, increasing to 3,301 at the 2011 census.

Position
It forms part of the Leicester Urban Area, and is on the A47 road, just east of the city area of Evington.

It constitutes Thurnby and Bushby, which have formed a single civil parish since 1935.

Conveniences
 Thurnby and Bushby has a primary school - St Lukes C of E primary school, which has strong links with St. Lukes Church.
 There is a public house - The Rose and Crown.
 Thurnby Scouts and Guides are situated on Court Road.

References

External links
Thurnby & Bushby Parish Walks
St Luke's Church

Civil parishes in Harborough District